Marian Baban (born 8 January 1976) is a Romanian sprint canoer who competed in the early to mid-2000s. He won three silver medals at the ICF Canoe Sprint World Championships with one in the K-4 200 m (2003) and two in the K-4 500 m (2001, 2003).

Baban, who was born in Turnu Măgurele, Teleorman County, also competed in two Summer Olympics, earning his best finish of seventh in the K-4 1000 m event at Athens in 2004.

European Championship medals
 Silver K4 500m  2006 Račice, Czech Republic 1:20.616
 Silver K4 1000m  2005 Poznan, Poland 2:51.015
 Bronze K4 500m  2005 Poznan, Poland 1:22.353
 Bronze K4 200m  2001 Milan, Italy 0:31.301

References

Sports-reference.com profile

1976 births
Canoeists at the 2000 Summer Olympics
Canoeists at the 2004 Summer Olympics
Living people
Olympic canoeists of Romania
People from Turnu Măgurele
Romanian male canoeists
ICF Canoe Sprint World Championships medalists in kayak